Mount Trutch is a mountain located on the border of Alberta and British Columbia. Canada. It was named in 1920 after Sir Joseph Trutch, a Canadian politician who was the first Lieutenant Governor of British Columbia.

See also
 List of peaks on the British Columbia–Alberta border

References

Three-thousanders of Alberta
Three-thousanders of British Columbia
Canadian Rockies